Central Institute of Technology was a Technical and Further Education (TAFE) institution based in Perth, Western Australia until 2016 when it became a part of North Metropolitan TAFE. It was the equal oldest post-secondary educational institution in Western Australia and the largest TAFE institution in Perth. Historically it was also known by the names of Perth Technical College, Central Metropolitan College of TAFE (CMC) and Central TAFE. On April 11, 2016 following a reform of all TAFEWA colleges, Central Institute of Technology amalgamated with West Coast Institute of Training and became known as North Metropolitan TAFE.

Campuses and facilities
The institute currently trains around 25,000 students each year and operates at five campuses in the Perth metropolitan area:

 Perth campus
 Leederville campus
 East Perth campus (eCentral)
 Mount Lawley campus
 Nedlands campus (Oral Health Care Centre of Western Australia)

Central Institute of Technology also caters for 1500 students from overseas each year and has offshore contracts for the delivery of Australian vocational qualifications in mainland China, Hong Kong, Mauritius, India and Kuwait.

Facilities at the main Northbridge campus include an art gallery and a simulated underground mine. East Perth campus, also known as eCentral, is one of the most technologically advanced campuses in Western Australia. The campus is partially powered by the largest single grid-connected solar system in the Perth CBD and one of the largest in the state.  A new building at the East Perth campus provides facilities for training in the mining and renewable energy industries.

An alliance between Central Institute of Technology, the University of Western Australia and Curtin University has resulted in the formation of the Oral Health Care Centre of Western Australia (OHCWA) in Nedlands.

In 2011, Central opened a $62 million training facility at 30 Aberdeen Street completing Central’s redevelopment of its city campus, linking all of the buildings in one education  precinct. 30 Aberdeen Street houses training portfolios for the areas of engineering, architecture design and building and programs, for the "lifestyle industries" including massage and beauty therapy treatment rooms.

All of Central's campuses are located in the Perth inner metropolitan area.

Courses
Central offers over 400 courses in areas including: 
 Business, Management, Marketing, Real Estate, Legal and Finance
 Creative and Digital (Art, Design and Media; Information Technology and Information Services)
 Engineering and Building
 English and Community Access
 Health and Community Services
 Resources and Science and Sustainability
 Sport and Education
 Tourism and Languages

Central Institute of Technology award courses are in line with the Australian Quality Training Framework (AQTF). The AQTF establishes standard titles and levels for courses across Australia.  The qualifications that are currently offered at Central include:
 Advanced Diploma
 Diploma
 Certificate IV
 Certificate III
 Certificate II
 Certificate I

Through its university pathway arrangements with Curtin University, The University of Western Australia (UWA), University of Notre Dame (UND), Murdoch University and Edith Cowan University (ECU), students can also gain access into university.

Central also offers a range of short courses and customised training for business.

Structure and employees

Central has a governing council and employs 1,300 staff in lecturing and administrative positions in:

 Art and Design
 Applied Design
 Building, Design & Construction
 Management and Business
 Community & Children's Services
 Community Learning and Partnerships
 English as a Second Language (ESL)
 Digital Content
 Engineering
 Finance & Property Services
 Health & Lifestyle
 Media
 Science, Resources & Environment
 Sport, Education & Disability
 Tourism & Languages

History

The Central Institute of Technology began as the Perth Technical School, holding its first classes from 16 May 1900 at the Old Perth Boys School and from various makeshift facilities along St Georges Terrace. The first enrolment was of 69 students in classes including chemistry, metallurgy, mineralogy, geology, woodwork, metalwork, art and design. In 1910 a purpose-built building was constructed to house the school.

Between 1905 and 1914, courses including pure mathematics, physics, chemistry and biology were taught at Perth Technical School on behalf of the University of Adelaide. This arrangement ceased in 1914 when the University of Western Australia became operational.

The school continued to grow in the following decades, establishing additional campuses and offering a growing list of qualifications. In 1966, the institution became more focused on vocational training when areas such as chemistry and metallurgy split away into the Western Australian Institute of Technology (WAIT) (now Curtin University).

In 1990, the institute became the Central Metropolitan College of TAFE following the amalgamation of affiliated colleges at Perth, Leederville, Wembley and Mt Lawley, as well as the Claremont School of Art and the WA School of Nursing. In late 2009 Central TAFE changed its name and branding to Central Institute of Technology.

The 1910 Perth Technical School building is listed in the Register of Heritage Places of the state Heritage Council as part of the group of buildings which includes Newspaper House, the WA Trustee Co and the Royal Insurance buildings. It is also listed in the National Estate.

Notable alumni 
Notable alumni of the institute include: Sir Walter James, 5th Premier of Western Australia (1902 to 1904); in the federal government Sir Billy Mackie Snedden, 17th Attorney-General, 23rd Treasurer and Leader of the Opposition; architect William G. Bennett; pioneer aviator Sir Norman Brearley; and businessmen Sir James Cruthers; and Sir Lance Brisbane. Speech pathologist Lionel Logue taught at the school from 1910 to 1911. Olympian Shirley Strickland taught mathematics and physics to returned servicemen in her spare time at the school in the period after World War II. Olympic swimmer Neil Brooks studied accountancy at the Leederville campus in 1978.

References

TAFE WA
Perth Cultural Centre